32 Broad Street is a Category B listed building at 32 Broad Street in Peterhead, Aberdeenshire, Scotland. It was built in 1858. Originally a Union Bank of Scotland, it is now home to a Bank of Scotland.

See also
List of listed buildings in Peterhead, Aberdeenshire

References

External links
 BANK OF SCOTLAND BUILDING BROAD STREET - Historic Environment Scotland

Category B listed buildings in Aberdeenshire
Broad Street 32
1858 establishments in Scotland
Commercial buildings completed in 1858